France was represented by Marie Myriam, with the song "L'oiseau et l'enfant", at the 1977 Eurovision Song Contest, which took place on 7 May in London. "L'oiseau et l'enfant" went on to bring France a fifth Eurovision victory, a record at the time.

Before Eurovision

National final 
Following the French success in 1976 with a song chosen through a national final, broadcaster TF1 again opted for a public selection.

Semi-finals
Each semi-final contained seven songs, with the top three in each going forward to the final. The qualifiers were chosen by public televoting.

Final
The final took place on 6 March 1977, hosted by Evelyn Leclercq, Patrick Sébastien and Yves Lecoq. The winner was chosen by public televoting.

At Eurovision
On the night of the final Myriam performed last in the running order, following Belgium. Pre-contest betting had suggested that the winner was likely to be one from Belgium, Germany, Ireland or the United Kingdom, with the French song not registering as a potential victor. The United Kingdom took the early initiative in the voting and held the lead until just over half way through, when a late run of high marks to "L'oiseau et l'enfant" and a dip in form from its challengers saw France claim the victory with a final total of 136 points, 15 ahead of the United Kingdom in second place. Although in later years "L'oiseau et l'enfant" attained the status of a Eurovision classic, at the time it was considered a surprising and unexpected winner. France had taken only three maximum 12s (from Finland, Germany and Switzerland) against six for the United Kingdom and four for Ireland, but had scored more consistently across the board, being the only country to receive votes from every other national jury.

Voting

References 

1977
Countries in the Eurovision Song Contest 1977
Eurovision